Horseradish (Armoracia rusticana, syn. Cochlearia armoracia) is a perennial plant of the family Brassicaceae (which also includes mustard, wasabi, broccoli, cabbage, and radish). It is a root vegetable, cultivated and used worldwide as a spice and as a condiment. The species is probably native to southeastern Europe and western Asia.

Description 
It is cultivated primarily for its large, white, tapered root. The white four-petalled flowers are scented and are borne in dense panicles. Established plants may form extensive patches and may become invasive unless carefully managed.

Intact horseradish root has little aroma. When cut or grated, enzymes from within the plant cells digest sinigrin (a glucosinolate) to produce allyl isothiocyanate (mustard oil), which irritates the mucous membranes of the sinuses and eyes. Once exposed to air or heat, horseradish loses its pungency, darkens in color, and develops a bitter flavor.

History
Horseradish has been cultivated since antiquity. Dioscorides listed horseradish equally as Persicon sinapi (Diosc. 2.186) or Sinapi persicum (Diosc. 2.168), which Pliny's Natural History reported as Persicon napy; Cato discusses the plant in his treatises on agriculture, and a mural in Pompeii shows the plant. Horseradish is probably the plant mentioned by Pliny the Elder in his Natural History under the name of Amoracia, and recommended by him for its medicinal qualities, and possibly the wild radish, or raphanos agrios of the Greeks. The early Renaissance herbalists Pietro Andrea Mattioli and John Gerard showed it under Raphanus. Its modern Linnaean genus Armoracia was first applied to it by Heinrich Bernhard Ruppius, in his Flora Jenensis, 1745, but Linnaeus himself called it Cochlearia armoracia.

Both root and leaves were used as a traditional medicine during the Middle Ages. The root was used as a condiment on meats in Germany, Scandinavia, and Britain. It was introduced to North America during European colonization; both George Washington and Thomas Jefferson mention horseradish in garden accounts. Native Americans used it to stimulate the glands, stave off scurvy, and as a diaphoretic treatment for the common cold.

William Turner mentions horseradish as Red Cole in his "Herbal" (1551–1568), but not as a condiment. In The Herball, or Generall Historie of Plantes (1597), John Gerard describes it under the name of raphanus rusticanus, stating that it occurs wild in several parts of England. After referring to its medicinal uses, he says:

Etymology and common names
The word horseradish is attested in English from the 1590s. It combines the word horse (formerly used in a figurative sense to mean strong or coarse) and the word radish. Some sources claim that the term originates from a mispronunciation of the German word "meerrettich" as "mareradish". However, this hypothesis has been disputed, as there is no historical evidence of this term being used.

In Central and Eastern Europe, horseradish is called khren, hren and ren (in various spellings like kren) in many Slavic languages, in Austria, in parts of Germany (where the other German name Meerrettich is not used), in North-East Italy, and in Yiddish (כריין transliterated as khreyn).

Cultivation

Horseradish is perennial in hardiness zones 2–9 and can be grown as an annual in other zones, although not as successfully as in zones with both a long growing season and winter temperatures cold enough to ensure plant dormancy. After the first frost in autumn kills the leaves, the root is dug and divided. The main root is harvested and one or more large offshoots of the main root are replanted to produce next year's crop. Horseradish left undisturbed in the garden spreads via underground shoots and can become invasive. Older roots left in the ground become woody, after which they are no longer culinarily useful, although older plants can be dug and re-divided to start new plants. The early season leaves can be distinctively different, asymmetric spiky, before the mature typical flat broad leaves start to be developed.

Pests and diseases
Widely introduced by accident, "cabbageworms", the larvae of Pieris rapae, the small white butterfly, are a common caterpillar pest in horseradish. The adults are white butterflies with black spots on the forewings that are commonly seen flying around plants during the day. The caterpillars are velvety green with faint yellow stripes running lengthwise down the back and sides. They move sluggishly when prodded. They overwinter in green pupal cases. Adults start appearing in gardens after the last frost and are a problem through the remainder of the growing season. There are three to five overlapping generations a year. Mature caterpillars chew large, ragged holes in the leaves leaving the large veins intact. Handpicking is an effective control strategy in home gardens.

Production

In the United States, horseradish is grown in several areas such as Eau Claire, Wisconsin, and Tule Lake, California. The most concentrated growth occurs in the Collinsville, Illinois region.

30,000 metric tonnes of horseradish are produced in Europe annually, of which Hungary produces 12,000, making it the biggest single producer.

Culinary uses

The distinctive pungent taste of horseradish is from the compound allyl isothiocyanate. Upon crushing the flesh of horseradish, the enzyme myrosinase is released and acts on the glucosinolates sinigrin and gluconasturtiin, which are precursors to the allyl isothiocyanate. The allyl isothiocyanate serves the plant as a natural defense against herbivores. Since allyl isothiocyanate is harmful to the plant itself, it is stored in the harmless form of the glucosinolate, separate from the enzyme myrosinase. When an animal chews the plant, the allyl isothiocyanate is released, repelling the animal. Because of this instability, horseradish sauces lack the pungency of the freshly crushed roots.

Cooks may use the terms "horseradish" or "prepared horseradish" to refer to the mashed (or grated) root of the horseradish plant mixed with vinegar. Prepared horseradish is white to creamy-beige in color. It can be stored for up to 3 months under refrigeration, but eventually will darken, indicating less flavour. The leaves of the plant are edible, either cooked or raw when young, with a flavor similar but weaker than the roots.

On Passover, many Ashkenazi Jews (outside of Israel) use grated horseradish as a choice for Maror (bitter herbs) at the Passover Seder.

Horseradish sauce

Horseradish sauce made from grated horseradish root and vinegar is a common condiment in the United Kingdom, in Denmark (with sugar added) and in Poland. In the UK, it is usually served with roast beef, often as part of a traditional Sunday roast, but can be used in a number of other dishes, including sandwiches or salads. A variation of horseradish sauce, which in some cases may substitute the vinegar with other products like lemon juice or citric acid, is known in Germany as Tafelmeerrettich. Also available in the UK is Tewkesbury mustard, a blend of mustard and grated horseradish originating in medieval times and mentioned by Shakespeare (Falstaff says: "his wit's as thick as Tewkesbury Mustard" in Henry IV Part II). A similar mustard, called Krensenf or Meerrettichsenf, is common in Austria and parts of Germany. In France, sauce au raifort is used in Alsatian cuisine. In Russia, horseradish root is usually mixed with grated garlic and small amount of tomatoes for color (Khrenovina sauce).

In the US, the term "horseradish sauce" refers to grated horseradish combined with mayonnaise or salad dressing. In Denmark it is mixed with whipping cream and as such used on top of traditional Danish open sandwiches with beef (boiled or steaked) slices. Prepared horseradish is a common ingredient in Bloody Mary cocktails and in cocktail sauce, and is used as a sauce or sandwich spread. Horseradish cream is a mixture of horseradish and sour cream and is served au jus for a prime rib dinner.

Vegetable

In Europe, there are two varieties of chrain. "Red" chrain is mixed with red beetroot and "white" chrain contains no beetroot. Chrain is a part of Christian Easter and Jewish Passover tradition (as maror) in Eastern and Central Europe.
 In parts of Southern Germany "kren" is a component of the traditional wedding dinner. It is served with cooked beef and a dip made from lingonberry to balance the slight hotness of the Kren.
 In Poland, a variety with red beetroot is called  or simply ćwikła.
 In Russia, a very popular ingredient for pickles (cucumbers, tomatoes, mushrooms). 
 In Ashkenazi European Jewish cooking, beetroot horseradish is commonly served with gefilte fish.
 In Transylvania and other Romanian regions, red beetroot with horseradish is used as a salad served with lamb dishes at Easter called sfecla cu hrean.
 In Serbia, ren is an essential condiment with cooked meat and freshly roasted suckling pig.
 In Croatia, freshly grated horseradish (Croatian: Hren) is often eaten with boiled ham or beef.
 In Slovenia, and in the adjacent Italian regions of Friuli Venezia Giulia and nearby Italian region of Veneto, horseradish (often grated and mixed with sour cream, vinegar, hard-boiled eggs, or apples) is also a traditional Easter dish.
 In the Italian regions of Lombardy, Emilia-Romagna, and Piedmont, it is called barbaforte (strong beard) and is a traditional accompaniment to bollito misto; while in northeastern regions like Trentino-Alto Adige/Südtirol, Veneto and Friuli-Venezia Giulia, it is still called kren or cren. In the southern region of Basilicata it is known as rafano and used for the preparation of rafanata, a main course made of horseradish, eggs, cheese and sausage.
 Horseradish is also used as a main ingredient for soups. In Poland, horseradish soup is a common Easter Day dish.

Relation to wasabi
Outside Japan, the Japanese condiment wasabi, although traditionally prepared from the true wasabi plant (Wasabia japonica), is now usually made with horseradish due to the scarcity of the wasabi plant. Both plants are members of the family Brassicaceae.

Nutritional content
In a 100-gram amount, prepared horseradish provides 48 calories and has high content of vitamin C with moderate content of sodium, folate and dietary fiber, while other essential nutrients are negligible in content. In a typical serving of one tablespoon (15 grams), horseradish supplies no significant nutrient content.

Horseradish contains volatile oils, notably mustard oil.

Biomedical uses
The enzyme horseradish peroxidase (HRP), found in the plant, is used extensively in molecular biology and biochemistry primarily for its ability to amplify a weak signal and increase detectability of a target molecule. HRP has been used in decades of research to visualize under microscopy and assess non-quantitatively the permeability of capillaries, particularly those of the brain.

References

External links

 Horseradish Information Council
 

Armoracia
Alsatian cuisine
Condiments
Flora of Europe
Medicinal plants
Plants described in 1753
Taxa named by Carl Linnaeus
Root vegetables
Spices
Vermont cuisine